The 2003–04 season was AS Monaco FC's 47th season in Ligue 1. They finished third in Ligue 1, were knocked out of the Coupe de la Ligue by Marseille at the Round of 32, knocked out of the Coupe de France by Châteauroux at the quarter-finals and reached the final of the UEFA Champions League where they were defeated by Porto.

Season summary
Monaco were clear outsiders to progress in the Champions League, but defeated tournament favourites like Real Madrid and Chelsea to face another unfancied side, Porto, in the final. Monaco were comprehensively beaten 3–0 by José Mourinho's side, but that did not dampen Monaco's achievement of having defied their underdog status to come within 90 minutes of club football's greatest prize.

Spanish striker Fernando Morientes (signed on loan from Real Madrid) was Monaco's top goalscorer with 22 goals in all competitions.

Squad

Out on loan

Transfers

In:

Out:

Competitions

Ligue 1

League table

Results summary

Results by round

Matches

Coupe de la Ligue

Coupe de France

UEFA Champions League

Group stage

Knockout stage

Round of 16

Quarter-final

Semi-final

Final

Statistics

Appearances and Goals

|-
|colspan="14"|Players away from AS Monaco on loan:

|-
|colspan="14"|Players who appeared for AS Monaco that left during the season:
|}

Goal scorers

Disciplinary Record

Notes and references

Notes

References

Monaco
AS Monaco FC seasons
AS Monaco
AS Monaco